The community of Indians in Kuwait includes Indian expatriates in Kuwait, as well as Kuwaiti citizens of Indian origin or descent. According to the Indian ministry of external affairs, there are around 1,020,000 Indians as of 2020. The majority of these originate from the south Indian states of Kerala, Andhra Pradesh, Telangana, Tamil Nadu, with the former constituting for 66% of the population of Indian nationals.

Overview

Kuwaitis view India as a fast-growing economy and a source of highly qualified professional and technical personnel.

Professionals like Engineers, doctors, Lawyers, Chartered accountants, Scientists, software experts, management professionals and consultants, Architects, retail traders and businessmen mainly constitute the Indian community. Of late, there has been an increase in the number of highly qualified Indian experts in hi-tech areas, especially in the software and financial sector in Kuwait. In the field of health, India not only supplies top specialists but also para-medical staff who enjoy a high reputation. Inward remittances from Kuwait to India are substantial.

There are 18 Indian schools in Kuwait affiliated to the Central Board of Secondary Education (CBSE). There were 164 Indian community Associations earlier registered with the Indian Embassy of Kuwait. Following introduction of a re-registration requirement, 106 of these Indian community Associations have once again registered with the Embassy and the number of registered Associations is growing at a steady pace.

Religion
Indian are the most numerous expat group in Kuwait, consisting of a number of Muslims, Christians, Hindus, Sikhs and Buddhists. Muslims account for the largest number of expatriates in Kuwait. Members of religious groups not mentioned in the Quran, such as Hindus, Sikhs and Buddhists, are not allowed to build official places of worship. However, these groups have religious freedom and can freely engage in religious activities, including public marriage and other celebrations.

Region
South India are found in Jleeb Al-Shuyoukh, Farwaniya, Mangaf, Salmiya Little, Mahboula.

Most North India are found in Salmiya.

Education

Indian schools in Kuwait include:
 Bharatiya Vidya Bhavans – Indian Educational School, Smart Indian School
 Indian Public School
 Salmiya Indian Model School Kuwait
 Jabriya Indian School
 Indian Central School (Kuwait)
 Indian Community School Kuwait
 India International School (Kuwait)
 Carmel School (Kuwait)
 Indian English Academy School
 Fahaheel Al Watanieh Indian Private School
 United Indian School
 Learners Own Academy
 Integrated Indian School
 Indian Central School
 Gulf Indian School

References

External links
  Indians in Kuwait

Kuwait
Ethnic groups in Kuwait
India–Kuwait relations